Alexander Bublik defeated Alexander Zverev in the final, 6–4, 6–3 to win the singles title at the 2022 Open Sud de France. It was his maiden ATP Tour title.

David Goffin was the defending champion, but lost to Adrian Mannarino in the second round.

Seeds 
The top four seeds received a bye into the second round.

Draw

Finals

Top half

Bottom half

Qualifying

Seeds

Qualifiers

Qualifying draw

First qualifier

Second qualifier

Third qualifier

Fourth qualifier

References

External links
 Main draw
 Qualifying draw

Singles
2022 ATP Tour